Wing Tai Properties Limited (previously USI Holdings Limited) is a Hong Kong based property developer, operator of hospitality services and owner of several tailoring factories. Listed on the Hong Kong Stock Exchange from formation in 1991, it operates hotels under the brand names of WingTai Asia and Lanson Place.

Lanson Place
Lanson Place is a wholly owned subsidiary of Wing Tai Properties Limited, currently manages nine properties (four of which Wing Tai has equity in) under the Lanson Place brand, comprising a hotel and serviced residences in Hong Kong, Beijing, Shanghai, Kuala Lumpur and Singapore.

Lanson Place Bukit Ceylon Serviced Residences in Kuala Lumpur was opened in August 2013, while Lu Xiang Yuan Serviced Suites in Shanghai is scheduled to open at the end of 2014.

WingTai Asia
In July 2007, USI completed a general offer for the issued shares of Winsor Properties Holdings Limited. This rationalized Wing Tai Holdings and USI's shareholding in Winsor Properties, resulting in USI holding an interest of about 80%.

Tailoring
USI's has garment factories in Hong Kong, China and Southeast Asia. It also has garment trading and branded products distribution. They were owners of Gieves & Hawkes, which they divested in 2012.

References

Companies listed on the Hong Kong Stock Exchange
Hospitality companies of Hong Kong
Real estate companies of Singapore